Javier Sagrera (born 12 January 2004) is a Spanish racing driver, currently competing in the GB3 Championship for Elite Motorsport. He previously raced in the F4 Spanish Championship.

Career

Karting 
In 2017 Sagrera took part in his first national and continental karting competitions, with second place in the junior category of the Spanish Championship being his most notable achievement that year. The Spaniard would progress to the senior class the following year, finishing third in the same series, only two points behind the champion. Sagrera finished his karting career at the end of 2019.

Lower formulae 
Sagrera made his single-seater debut with MOL Racing in the final round of the F4 Spanish Championship at the Circuit de Barcelona-Catalunya. Despite being a rookie, he managed to finish the third race in the top ten, although he did not receive points as he was classed as a guest driver.

In 2020 the Spaniard returned to the Spanish Championship, this time racing the first four rounds of the season for MOL. However, Sagrera was only able to score eight points over the course of the 12 races, and ended up 21st in the standings.

GB3 Championship 
Sagrera stepped up to the GB3 Championship in 2021, partnering Ginetta Junior Champion Tom Lebbon and Mexican José Garfias at Elite Motorsport. He started his season strongly, scoring a podium in just his third race in the series. Sagrera wouldn't manage to hit those same heights again that season, although he only missed out on a top ten finish in five of the following 16 races he finished.

Racing record

Career summary 

† As Sagrera was a guest driver, he was ineligible for points.

* Season still in progress.

Complete F4 Spanish Championship results 
(key) (Races in bold indicate pole position) (Races in italics indicate fastest lap)

Complete GB3 Championship results 
(key) (Races in bold indicate pole position) (Races in italics indicate fastest lap)

References

External links 

 

2004 births
Living people
Spanish racing drivers
BRDC British Formula 3 Championship drivers
Spanish F4 Championship drivers
Carlin racing drivers